Shaptul also been written as Xiabutuoqu ,Xiaputule and Xaptul.   is a town in Payzawat County, Kashgar Prefecture, Xinjiang, China.

History
1958, Shaptul was part of Gaochao Commune.1964, Xiafutao Commune was created from part of Gaochao Commune.1966, the commune was renamed Dongfeng Commune.1984, the commune was made into Shaptul Township.2014, Shaptul Township was disestablished and Shaptul Town was created.

Administrative divisions

Shaptul includes twenty-four villages (PRC Hanyu Pinyin-derived names, except where Uyghur is provided):

References

Populated places in Xinjiang
Township-level divisions of Xinjiang